Palwal district was created on 15 August 2008. It is the 21st district of Haryana state in northern India. Palwal City is the headquarters of the district. It is part of the Braj region.

Background

Etymology
According to legend, the city of Palwal is named for the demon Palwalasur who was said to have ruled during the reign of Pandavas.

History

Palwal is supposed to figure in the earliest Aryan traditions under the name of Apelava, part of the Pandava kingdom of Indraprastha, which was later restored by Vikramaditya.

During the reign of Mughal empire, the freedom fighter Kanha Rawat carried forward the legacy of Jat leader Gokula to fight against the oppressive Aurangzeb and his policy of persecuting Hindus, forcible conversion of Hindus to Islam, and high tax rate. After Kanha refused to convert his religion to Islam, Aurangzeb had him buried alive at Rawatpara. A statue of Kanha was unveiled inside the park in February 2014 by Vishvendra Singh - the scion of Bharatpur State. Kanha Rawat Memorial Park was constructed around his samadhi at his native Bahin village in Hathin tehsil.

During the British Raj, Palwal was a part of the Punjab Province and Gurgaon district.

Mahatma Gandhi was first arrested at Palwal railway station. The historical building "Gandhi Ashrama" was erected in memory of the incident.

On 15 August 1979, Gurgaon district was divided, with Palwal becoming part of the new Faridabad district. Later, Palwal became the 21st district of Haryana on 15 August 2008.

Administration

Palwal district comprises 282 villages, 237 gram panchayats, one municipal council, two municipal committees, three sub-divisions, four development blocks and three tehsils. The sub-divisions are under the control of sub-divisional magistrate while each development block is under the control of a block development and panchayat officer. All the blocks are covered under Swarn Jayanti Gram Swarozgar Yojna and other developmental programmes. Developmental programmes are overseen by the additional deputy commissioner-cum chief executive officer, DRDA Palwal. The district is under the overall charge of the deputy commissioner who is also the chairman of the District
Rural Development Agency.

Geography

Topograpgy

It has an average elevation of 195 metres (639 ft).

Forests

The Forest Department aims to increase forestation for soil conservation in the district, in line with the National Forests Policy of the Ministry of Environment and Forests. According to the plan, about one-third of the geographical area should be under tree cover. In order to achieve this objective, large-scale plantings have been undertaken by the community, panchayat, government and private land over the last 20 years. Saplings of eucalyptus, shisham, neem, and other fruit plants were distributed free of costs to farmers to plant in their fields.

Economy and infrastructure

Palwal consists of agricultural and commercial areas, and has many temples, schools, colleges and banks. It also contains developed areas like Housing board colony, Kalra colony, New colony, main market, shivapuri, Krishna colony, kailash nagar, shiv colony, camp colony and Huda sector 2. There is a main chowk called the Heart of Palwal. The government plans to develop the economy of Palwal in line with nearby cities like Delhi, Gurgaon, Noida, Faridabad, Hodal, Aligarh, and Mathura.

Transport

Delhi-Agra national highway passes through Palwal.

Demographics
According to the 2011 census, Palwal district had a population of 1,042,708. Its population growth rate over the decade 2001–2011 was 25.49%. Palwal had a sex ratio of 879 females for every 1,000 males, and a literacy rate of 70.3%. Scheduled Castes make up 19.48% of the population.

Religion

The region is located at the border of Mewat and Braj. Mewat is Muslim-dominated while Braj is Hindu-dominated.

Language 

At the time of the 2011 Census of India, 88.27% of the population spoke Hindi, 3.81% Mewati, 3.59% Urdu and 3.22% Haryanvi as their first language. The local language is an amalgamation of Haryanvi & Braj. Mewati is spoken in the Hathin tehsi l.

Culture

Palwal has an annual festival known as "Baldev Chhat Ka Mela" which celebrates the legend of Balarama killing the demon Palwasur during the reign of Pandavas.  There is also a temple dedicated to Balaram near the chowk (marketplace) of the municipal office.

Notable people
 Sunil Lanba, 23rd Chief of the Naval Staff of the Indian Navy
 Shushma Swaraj, 29th Minister of External Affairs
 Rohtas Goel, Founder Chairman & Managing Director of  Omaxe Limited
 J.C. Chaudhry, Founder & Chairman of Aakash Educational Services Limited  
 Sudhir Chaudhary, Journalist at Zee News 
 Deepak Mangla, Current MLA of Palwal
 Karan Singh Dalal, Ex. MLA of Palwal and former Minister in the Government of Haryana.

See also
 Administrative divisions of Haryana
 List of cities in Haryana by population
 List of constituencies of the Haryana Legislative Assembly
 List of districts of Haryana
 List of highways in Haryana
 Outline of Haryana
 Railway in Haryana

Notes

References

External links
 Official website
 History of Haryana

 
2008 establishments in Haryana
Districts of Haryana

vi:Palwal